In organic chemistry, nitroso refers to a functional group in which the nitric oxide group is attached to an organic moiety. As such, various nitroso groups can be categorized as C-nitroso compounds (e.g., nitrosoalkanes), S-nitroso compounds (nitrosothiols), N-nitroso compounds (e.g., nitrosamines), and O-nitroso compounds (alkyl nitrites).

Synthesis
Nitroso compounds can be prepared by the reduction of nitro compounds or by the oxidation of hydroxylamines. 
Ortho-nitrosophenols may be produced by the Baudisch reaction. In the Fischer–Hepp rearrangement aromatic 4-nitrosoanilines are prepared from the corresponding nitrosamines.

Properties

Nitrosoarenes typically participate in a monomer–dimer equilibrium.  The dimers, which are often pale yellow, are often favored in the solid state, whereas the deep-green monomers are favored in dilute solution or at higher temperatures.  They exist as cis and trans isomers.

As a consequence, they are generally heat- and light-sensitive. Compounds containing O–(NO) or N–(NO) bonds generally have even lower bond dissociation energies. For instance, N-nitrosodiphenylamine, Ph2N–N=O, has a N–N bond dissociation energy of only . Organonitroso compounds serve as a ligands for transition metals.

Reactions
Many reaction exists which make use of an intermediate nitroso compound, such as the Barton reaction and Davis–Beirut reaction, as well as in the synthesis of indoles, for example: Baeyer–Emmerling indole synthesis, Bartoli indole synthesis. In the Saville reaction, mercury is used to replace a nitrosyl from a thiol group.

Nitrosation vs. nitrosylation 
Nitrite can enter two kinds of reaction, depending on the physico-chemical environment. 
 Nitrosylation is adding a nitrosyl ion  to a metal (e.g. iron) or a thiol, leading to nitrosyl iron  (e.g., in nitrosylated heme = nitrosylheme) or S-nitrosothiols (RSNOs).
 Nitrosation is adding a nitrosonium ion  to an amine – leading to a nitrosamine. This conversion occurs at acidic pH, particularly in the stomach, as shown in the equation for the formation of N-phenylnitrosamine:
 NO2- + H+ <=> HONO
 HONO + H+ <=> H2O + NO+
 C6H5NH2 + NO+ -> C6H5N(H)NO + H+
Those derived from secondary amines (e.g.,  derived from dimethylamine) are more robust. It is these N-nitrosamines that are carcinogens in rodents.

Nitrosyl in inorganic chemistry

Nitrosyls are non-organic compounds containing the NO group, for example directly bound to the metal via the N atom, giving a metal–NO moiety. Alternatively, a nonmetal example is the common reagent nitrosyl chloride. Nitric oxide is a stable radical, having an unpaired electron. Reduction of nitric oxide gives the nitrosyl anion, :
NO + e- -> NO-

Oxidation of NO yields the nitrosonium cation, :
NO -> NO+ + e-

Nitric oxide can serve as a ligand forming metal nitrosyl complexes or just metal nitrosyls.

In food

In foodstuffs and in the gastro-intestinal tract, nitrosation and nitrosylation do not have the same consequences on consumer health.

Cured meat is also added with sodium ascorbate (or erythorbate or vitamin C). Ascorbate and pH 5 thus favor nitrosylation of heme iron, forming nitrosylheme, a red pigment when included inside myoglobin, and a pink pigment when it has been released by cooking. It participates to the "bacon flavor" of cured meat. According to a consultant for the European lobby for processed meats K-O Honikel, nitrosylheme is thus considered a benefit for the meat industry and for consumers. According to scientists outside of the processed-meat industry, nitrosylheme is considered a carcinogenic compound.
 In the stomach: secreted hydrogen chloride makes an acidic environment (pH 2) and ingested nitrite (with food or saliva) leads to nitrosation of amines, that yields nitrosamines (potential carcinogens). Nitrosation is low if amine concentration is low (e.g., low-protein diet, no fermented food) or if vitamin C concentration is high (e.g., high fruit diet). Then S-nitrosothiols are formed, that are stable at pH 2.
 In the colon: neutral pH does not favor nitrosation. No nitrosamine is formed in stools, even after addition of a secondary amine or nitrite. Neutral pH favors  release from S-nitrosothiols, and nitrosylation of iron. The previously called NOC (N-nitroso compounds) measured by Bingham's team in stools from red meat-fed volunteers were, according to Bingham and Kuhnle, largely non-N-nitroso ATNC (apparent total nitroso compounds), e.g., S-nitrosothiols and nitrosyl iron (as nitrosyl heme).

See also 
 Nitrosamine, the functional group with the NO attached to an amine, such as R2N–NO
 Nitrosobenzene
 Nitric oxide
 Nitroxyl

References

Functional groups
 
Nitrosyl compounds